Čierne Kľačany is a village and municipality in Zlaté Moravce District of the Nitra Region, of Slovakia. It is best known for the archeological find of the Pyxis of Čierne Kľačany.

History
In historical records the village was first mentioned in 1209.

Geography
The municipality lies at an altitude of 190 metres and covers an area of 10.977 km². It has a population of about 1,120 people.

Ethnicity
The population is roughly 99% Slovak.

Facilities
The village has a small public library and football pitch.

Genealogical resources

The records for genealogical research are available at the state archive "Statny Archiv in Nitra, Slovakia"

 Roman Catholic church records (births/marriages/deaths): 1716-1896 (parish B)

See also
 List of municipalities and towns in Slovakia

References

External links
Official homepage
Surnames of living people in Cierne Klacany

Villages and municipalities in Zlaté Moravce District
Archaeological sites in Slovakia